Sarah Knapp is an American actress, writer, and lyricist, probably best known for writing the lyrics for The Immigrant. As an actress, she appeared in the off-Broadway shows Opal and The No-Frills Revue. Knapp also appeared on Broadway in The Scarlet Pimpernel.

External links

Sarah Knapp at the Lortel Archives

Living people
Year of birth missing (living people)
American stage actresses
American lyricists
21st-century American women